Brooks Bay is a rural locality in the local government area (LGA) of Huon Valley in the South-east LGA region of Tasmania. The 2016 census recorded a population of 28 for the state suburb of Brooks Bay.

History 
Brooks Bay is a confirmed locality.

Geography
The north-eastern boundary follows the shoreline of the Huon River estuary.

Road infrastructure 
Route C638 (Esperance Coast Road) runs through from north-east to south-east.

References

Towns in Tasmania
Localities of Huon Valley Council